Aleksander "Alex" Bosak (born 14 August 1993) is a Polish racing driver.

Career

Karting
Bosak began karting in 2007 in the easykart110 Category of the Polish karting Championship. He continued to race in the various local and European karting championships. In 2009, he finished as runner-up in the easykart125 Category of the European Championship and took a championship title in the Polish Championship in the same category.

Formula Renault
In 2012, Bosak moved into open-wheel racing, competing in Formula Renault 2.0 Alps with the One Racing. He ended the season 39th, and was penultimate among the drivers, who compete a whole season. He also participated in the Formula Renault 2.0 Northern European Cup round at Spielberg with the same team.

Bosak stayed in the series for 2013 Formula Renault 2.0 Alps season but switched to SMP Racing by Koiranen team. He improved to 30th position in the final series standings but again failed to score appoint. He also competed in three rounds of the Eurocup Formula Renault 2.0 and Formula Renault 2.0 Northern European Cup.

Bosak remained in Formula Renault 2.0 Alps for the third consecutive season, joining Prema Powerteam. He had ten point-scoring finishes, which allowed him to take eleventh place in the standings. He had a wild-card entry in the Spa round of the Eurocup Formula Renault 2.0 with the same team.

GP3 Series
In 2015, Bosak raced in the GP3 Series with Arden International, finishing 20th with one points finish at Spa.

Racing record

Career summary

† As Bosak was a guest driver, he was ineligible for championship points.

Complete GP3 Series results
(key) (Races in bold indicate pole position) (Races in italics indicate fastest lap)

References

External links
 

1993 births
Living people
Polish racing drivers
Formula Renault 2.0 Alps drivers
Formula Renault 2.0 NEC drivers
Formula Renault Eurocup drivers
GP3 Series drivers
Place of birth missing (living people)
World Series Formula V8 3.5 drivers
Prema Powerteam drivers
Arden International drivers
AV Formula drivers
SMP Racing drivers
Koiranen GP drivers